Bidrece Azor (born 14 March 1988) is a Haitian-Italian football player, who currently plays for ACD Poggese in Italy.

Early years
Azor was born in Delmas, Haiti. He holds Italian citizenship.

International career
He played with the National Under-23. His goals have allowed Haiti to overcome the first two rounds of the CONCACAF U-23 Championship valid for qualifying for the 2008 Summer Olympics in Beijing.

References

External links

1988 births
Living people
Haitian footballers
Haitian expatriate footballers
Haitian emigrants to Italy
Italian people of Haitian descent
Sportspeople from Port-au-Prince
Serie A players
Serie B players
S.P.A.L. players
S.S. Teramo Calcio players
U.S. Lecce players
U.C. Sampdoria players

Association football forwards
A.S.D. Fanfulla players